Sodium channel subunit beta-2 is a protein that in humans is encoded by the SCN2B gene.

See also
 Sodium channel

References

Further reading

External links 
 
 

Ion channels